Wesley Chapel is a census-designated place in Pasco County, Florida, United States. Wesley Chapel is a suburb in the Tampa Bay Area. Wesley Chapel originated in the mid-1800s as a cohesive community of settlers who demonstrated a uniquely rural authenticity and independence of spirit. Evidence of Native American presence in the area has been documented as early as 10,000 BC. Lumber harvesting and turpentine production became prominent industries, while cash-crop farming, citrus, and livestock ranching provided sustenance for the pioneer settlement. Charcoal kilns, gator hunting, and moonshine stills supplemented incomes and spawned legends. The community was also identified by the monikers Gatorville, Double Branch, and Godwin. From 1897 to 1902, Wesley Chapel boasted its own post office, two sawmills, and a general store. Primitive roads left residents with an informal town nucleus, and services shifted to surrounding towns until the late 20th century, when postal service and incorporation emerged, and the lumber trusts of John D. Rockefeler, Otto Hermann Kahn, and Edwin Wiley morphed into sizable ranches. The pioneer Boyett(e), Gillett(e), Godwin, and Kersey families received land grants in the area in the 1840s. The real influx of settlers, however, began around the Civil War when the Stanleys and Coopers arrived. The population was 44,092 at the 2010 census, making it the most populous community in Pasco County. In 2003, some residents of Wesley Chapel started a movement to incorporate the community as a city (including areas not in the official CDP), but these plans never materialized.

Geography
Wesley Chapel is located at  (28.178688, -82.350676).

Residents choose the area because of its proximity to Interstate 75 and Interstate 275, 25 miles north of Downtown Tampa, and other major locales. Adjacent to its south is the region of New Tampa, part of incorporated Tampa.

Demographics

As of the census of 2010, there were 44,092 people, 15,745 households, and 11,841 families residing in the CDP.    There were 17,764 housing units .  The racial makeup of the CDP was 74.97% White, 20.12% Hispanic or Latino,(of any race) 11.39% African American, 0.25% Native American, 5.72% Asian, 0.11% Pacific Islander, 3.97% from other races, and 3.57% from two or more races.

There were 15,745 households, out of which 40.19% had children under the age of 18 living with them, 58.8% were married couples living together, 10.75% had a female householder with no husband present, and 24.8% were non-families. 18.58% of all households were made up of individuals, and 3.13% had someone living alone who was 65 years of age or older.  The average household size was 2.80 and the average family size was 3.22.

In the CDP, the population was spread out, with 28.27% under the age of 18, 4.69% from 20 to 24, 32.58% from 25 to 44, 23.36% from 45 to 64, and 8.86% who were 65 years of age or older.  The median age was 35.2 years..

Growth

Originally called Double Branch for the area's twin creeks, the community was named for the Methodist church that stood on the northwest corner of SR 54 and Boyette Road. A popular nickname for the area was "Gatorville".

The area has 3 middle schools and 3 high schools, most of which are new as well as 3 charter schools. Three planned malls have now opened, including the Shops at Wiregrass, Tampa Premium Outlets, and a big box mall called The Grove on the northern perimeter. Wiregrass is known for its well-reviewed restaurants, bars & shops. Cypress Creek Town Center & Tampa Premium Outlets are now open (2016–17) and continuously growing. Two new schools were built in 2007 and 2008, Dr. John Long Middle School and Wiregrass Ranch High School.

In 2016, Wiregrass Elementary opened its doors next to JLMS. In 2017, Cypress Creek Middle School and Cypress Creek High School opened as the 3rd middle school and high school in the town. Pasco Hernando State College-Porter Campus has been open since 2013 next to WRHS. Wesley Chapel has one of the highest concentrations of top ranked public schools in Florida according to Public School Review. 

Wesley Chapel is home to the nation's first "Man-Made Sparkling Lagoon" boasting a 7.5 acre freshwater pool in the Epperson Community.

It is home to many Worship homes and churches, rooted in the history of the growth of the town. This includes Iglesia de Dios Nueva Vida, on Boyette Road, Faith Lutheran Church on Foamflower Blvd, and Life Church on Old Pasco Road.

Wesley Chapel has been a major catalyst in the rapid growth of Pasco County, the 38th fastest-growing county in the nation. and retains much in the way of wildlife.

As of July 2007, a new county park opened at the southwest corner of Boyette and Overpass roads.
In March 2008, State Road 56 was extended east from its then terminus at Bruce B. Downs Boulevard to a temporary terminus at Meadow Pointe Boulevard. In late 2019, it was extended further east to its final terminus at US 301 in Zephyrhills. Wesley Chapel was also listed as one of the "8 boomtowns of 2008" by the Gadberry Group's annual list.
Wesley Chapel has a new hospital called Advent Health (formerly Florida Hospital) at Wesley Chapel, and Pasco-Hernando State College's latest campus, Porter Campus at Wiregrass Ranch.

See also
 Connected City, Florida

References

External links

History of Wesley Chapel
Local Wesley Chapel News
Wesley Chapel, Pasco County, Florida

Census-designated places in Pasco County, Florida
Census-designated places in Florida